Lyndon Smith (born June 7, 1989) is an American actress. She is known for her roles as Natalie in the NBC drama Parenthood (2013–2015) and Dierdre in the TNT police drama Public Morals (2015).

Life
Smith is from Pensacola, Florida and graduated from the University of Florida in 2012. She is married to actor Steve Talley. They were wed in Kauai, Hawaii.

Career
In 2013 Smith began playing the recurring role of Natalie on the NBC drama series Parenthood, a role she played for the series' final two seasons. In 2014 she joined the cast of Ed Burns's 2015 TNT police drama series, Public Morals.

In 2016 Smith was cast in the film Step Sisters, which was released on Netflix in 2018.

Filmography

Film

Television

References

External links

1989 births
American television actresses
Actresses from Florida
Living people
People from Pensacola, Florida
21st-century American actresses
University of Florida alumni